Stephen Sohn (born June 5, 1986) is a Korean American model.

Personal life
Sohn was born in San Francisco, California with parents of Korean origin. During his childhood, he was raised in South Korea and United States. Sohn attended The Hill School in Pottstown, Pennsylvania where he was a top scorer student, and then he graduated with a degree in Economics and Mathematics from Duke University in Durham, North Carolina. He allegedly admired a Thai beauty queen Charm Osathanond, Miss Thailand Universe 2006.

Career

Sohn's modeling career takes place in mostly Thailand where he was introduced by Haruehun Airry. Sohn debuted his modeling career with Thai leading magazines namely Lips and Volume in 2009.
He participated in fashion catwalks in the downtown Siam Square and in the same year modeled for Zenithorial in the ELLE Fashion Week in Bangkok, Thailand. His work later became reputed on social media, and he was listed on polls across Asia.
Sohn was voted as one of the most desirable guys of 2009 by T-Pageant, the largest beauty pageant community in Thailand. He later became a strategic pricing business analyst in Minneapolis, Minnesota and has not modeled since despite significant support on social media space and published magazine articles namely Men's Health Thailand for instance.

See also
 Haruehun Airry
 Men's Health (magazine)

References

External links
 Stephen Sohn on Facebook
 Photo by Haruehun Airry

1986 births
American models of Korean descent
American expatriates in Thailand
Living people
Male models from California
Duke University Trinity College of Arts and Sciences alumni
The Hill School alumni